Washington Park is bounded by West 12th, Race and Elm Streets in the Over-the-Rhine neighborhood of Cincinnati, Ohio, United States. The park is owned and operated by the Cincinnati Park Board. The  park served as Presbyterian and Episcopal cemeteries before it was acquired by the city from 1858 to 1863.

The park has an old-fashioned bandstand and many trees. Several American Civil War cannons and busts of Civil War heroes Frederick Hecker and Colonel Robert Latimer McCook, who commanded the German 9th Ohio Infantry (Die Neuner) are in the park. There is also a bronze tablet (1931) given by Sons and Daughters of the (Die Neuner) 9th O.V.I.

The Centennial Exposition of the Ohio Valley and Central States was held at the park in 1888. It was, in addition to the celebration of Ohio's progress, designed to celebrate the settlement of the Northwest Territory.

The park stands in the shadow of the Cincinnati Music Hall. While the now-demolished Washington Park School was located at its north end, a new School for Creative and Performing Arts currently stands across Twelfth Street at its south end.

Renovation

Cincinnati Park Board and nonprofit 3CDC finished renovation of the park in July 2012 after being closed for almost 18 months. The park officially opened on Friday, July 6, 2012 with a ribbon cutting ceremony and a concert by the Mukunoki Chorus of Gifu, Japan, in town for the World Choir Games, which had just begun in Cincinnati. The renovations cost about $46 million. In a similar renovation of Fountain Square, 3CDC used profits from parking to pay off loans it took out to develop the project. 3CDC is responsible for programming at the park and plans to offer programs regularly. Some events that have taken place since the renovation include a concert series with jazz, R&B, and bluegrass; movie screenings; yoga; a kickball league; and a concert by the band Over the Rhine.

References

External links

3CDC's Washington Park project website
Washington Park redevelopment website

Parks in Cincinnati
Urban public parks
Over-the-Rhine
1855 establishments in Ohio